Alberto Esteban Goicoechea (born 22 September 1986) is an Argentinean footballer.

Career

Goicochea started his senior career with Unión de Santa Fe in the Argentinean Primera B Nacional, where he made nin league appearances and scored zero goals. After that, he played for Sportivo Belgrano, Defensa y Justicia, San Martín de Tucumán, San Jorge de Tucumán, Sol de América de Formosa, Juventud Unida Universitario, Instituto Atlético Central Córdoba, Mons Calpe S.C., and Bangor City.

References

External links

1986 births
Living people
Footballers from Rosario, Santa Fe
Argentine footballers
Association football defenders
Primera Nacional players
Unión de Santa Fe footballers
Defensa y Justicia footballers
San Martín de Tucumán footballers
Instituto footballers
Mons Calpe S.C. players
Bangor City F.C. players
A.S. Sambenedettese players
Serie C players
Argentine expatriate footballers
Argentine expatriates in Wales
Argentine expatriates in Gibraltar
Argentine expatriates in Italy
Expatriate footballers in Wales
Expatriate footballers in Gibraltar
Expatriate footballers in Italy